The Blackwater Fever are an Australian blues guitar-drums band, formed in Brisbane, Queensland in 2005. They were awarded Best Blues & Roots Act at the 2006 Sunshine Coast Music Festival. They issued their debut five-track extended play, Abused Blues, in January 2006 by the founding duo of Shane Hicks on vocals and guitar; and Rick DeMarco on drums. The tracks had been recorded live-in-the-studio at OPM Studios, Brisbane. Hicks and DeMarco co-wrote "Blackwater", which provided the band's name, Hicks later recalled "[we were] brain storming for a band name we were having a hell of a time trying to come up with something. One of the first guitar/drums songs we wrote together was called ‘Blackwater’ and it’s about people catching a fever from drinking tainted water. Put all that together and you have our band name! We found out later that it was a term for severe malaria…. And because we were going for a dark swampy bluesy sound, we thought…. Perfect!"

By 2008 The Blackwater Fever had gained national radio exposure from youth radio station Triple J, on the Home & Hosed (October) and Roots 'n' All (November) segments, and from that station's Unearthed competition for new unsigned bands. In November 2008 they released their debut studio album, Sweet Misery, where DeMarco had been replaced by Andrew Walter on drums.

By late 2010 the line-up was a trio with Hicks and Walter joined by Jed A. Walters on bass guitar and keyboards. However their second album, In Stereo (June 2011), had been recorded before Walters had joined, "[Jed] didn't contribute to this album but he'll definitely be making a big contribution to the next one." Their third album, The Depths, appeared in March 2013. Luke Saunders of Reverb Street Press compared it with the previous two albums "[its] another intriguing step forward following the solid foundations the band laid on their dark and gritty debut, Sweet Misery (2009) and its more refined, equally accomplished follow-up, In Stereo (2011)."

Critical reception 

Radio station, PBS 106.7FM reviewer described Sweet Misery as including a "harrowing growl, a tortured electric guitar and the rhythmic stomp of an unrelenting drum kit. If you close your eyes you can almost smell the swamp and feel the moonlight on your face... Breaking your heart one minute only to pick you up with an irresistible rocker the next."

2018 Bio:
The Blackwater Fever return with a mighty fourth album, ‘Delusions’.

Taking their dark, distinctive sound and injecting it with ’90s grunge, ’50s slow dance, moments of prog rock, punk, soul and an ’80s New Order-inspired track, ‘Delusions’ sees the Brisbane trio sounding more adventurous, eclectic and surprisingly succinct than ever before.

With over three million Spotify streams, shows with The Black Keys and Tame Impala, plus their recent inclusion on Showtime TV series ‘Shameless’, The Blackwater Fever are riding a wave of momentum that’s only going to build off the back of ‘Delusions’.

“DARK RIVER OF VITRIOLIC ROCK ’N’ ROLL”– Time Off Magazine

Highlights:
- 3.2+ million on Spotify. Added to 51,000+ playlists.
- Opened for The Black Keys, Clutch, Truckfighters, Tame Impala, Violent Soho, Heavy Trash, Birds of Tokyo.
- Festivals played: The Big Day Out, Blues Fest, Peats Ridge, Festival of the Sun, Valley Fiesta.
- Music featured on HBO, Fox, ABC, UFC, Discovery Channel networks. Included on the soundtrack for Benetton and Quiksilver campaigns, and feature films The ‘Tunnel’, ‘The Crossing’ and most recently Showtime series ‘Shameless’.

Members 
Current members
 Shane Hicks - vocals, guitar (2005–present)
 Trevor Gee - drums (2020–present)
 Sean Thomas - keyboards, bass guitar, vocals, (2022–present)

Past members
 Jed A. Walters - keyboards, bass guitar (2010–2022)
 Jared Tredly - drums (2015–2018)
 Andrew Walter - drums (2007–2014)
 Rick DeMarco - drums (2005–2007)

Discography 

 Abused Blues EP (2006)
 Sweet Misery Album (2008)
 In Stereo Album (2011)
 The Depths Album (2013)
 Sweet Misery [remixed & remastered] Album (2017)
 In Stereo [remixed & remastered] Album (2017)
 Girl Beatles Cover (2017)
 Delusions Album (2018)
 Delusions B-Sides EP (2018)
 In Stereo B-Sides Album (2019)
 Temptator! Album (2022)

References

External links
 

Musical groups from Brisbane
Musical groups established in 2005